The ARO M461 was an off-road vehicle built in post World War II Romania by ARO.

IMS-57
The first model was IMS-57, named by the factory initials (Intreprinderea Metalurgică de Stat) and the year it was released. A total of 914 vehicles were built between 1957 and 1959, mostly handcrafted. During World War II, on the site of a paper plant belonging to Letea company from Câmpulung-Muscel, the production of plane propellers and shooting equipment for airplanes produced by IAR Brașov was organized. After the production was abandoned, a group of workers begun building the first Romanian motorcycles in 1953. The design (from Russian GAZ 69) and production of the first Romanian all-terrain vehicle IMS-57 began in 1957, using the parts that were produced as well as upgrading. The 914 IMS-57 produced had the following characteristics: coachwork with two doors and tarpaulin, 3260 cc gasoline engine,  at 2,800 rpm,  consumption. The construction was handicraft: the equipped chassis in functioning condition were tested on the route Câmpulung-Colibași where they were bodyworked, painted and finished in the Pitești factory UAP. The tin parts were made on wooden lasts. Among other oddities, the IMS-57 had manual windshield wipers.

M59
In 1959, the IMS-57 was replaced by M59, which was a substantial improvement over its predecessor. The cars were bodyworked (2 doors, 4 doors or pick-up), painted and finished in Câmpulung. During the four years in production (1959–1963) the number of vehicles built jumped from 803 (1959) to 3,222 (1963).

M461
A new model, the M461, was started in 1964. The design was similar to the previous models but every panel was different and the cars are clearly distinguishable. It showed look and finishing improvements, and a redesigned mechanics.

The export of M461 begun in 1965, to China and Colombia (2,000 pieces). The M461 was a very good performer for its time, having won a few international competitions: 1970 Forests Rally (Belgium), 1973 Sons of Beaches (Oregon). With improvements in their technology and performances, some 80,233 M461 land vehicles were produced by 1975, out of which 46,549 were exported and more were used by Romanian Army. About 3,000 M461s are still on the road in Romania, with a very active owners' club. Many of the cars were until recently used by the army. Late versions were known as M473 on the German market. It was eventually replaced by the ARO 24 Series vehicles.

Gallery

See also
 ARO 10 Series
 ARO 24 Series

External links

 ARO M461 Club website
 ARO Club Romania
 History of IMS 57
 Shop online for Aro M-461
 Blog for rebuilt Aro M-461
 M461 at Retromobil Club Romania

M461
Cars of Romania
Off-road vehicles
All-wheel-drive vehicles
1950s cars
1960s cars
1970s cars
Vehicles introduced in 1957